Freeway removal is a public policy of urban planning policy to demolish freeways and create mixed-use urban areas, parks, residential, commercial, or other land uses. Such highway removal is often part of a policy to promote smart growth, transit-oriented development, walkable and bicycle-friendly cities. In some cases freeways are re-imagined as boulevards, rebuilt as below-grade freeways underneath caps-and-stitches, or relocated through less densely-developed areas.

Background

Freeway removals most often occur in cities where highways were built through dense neighborhoods - a practice common in the 20th Century, particularly in U.S. cities following the 1956 enactment of the National Interstate and Defense Highways Act. These highways often created blight that minimized use of land space and reduced the quality of life for city residents. In the United States, the routes for interstate highways were often built through minority neighborhoods in urban centers, which often led to increasing racial segregation by creating physical barriers between neighborhoods.

Beginning in the late 20th century, as many highways reached the end of their lifespans, urban planners and activists began proposing demolishing or transforming highways in lieu of repairing them in an effort to alleviate the symptoms of displacement and lack of neighborhood connectivity. In many cases, there are political battles between citizens' groups who are proponents of freeway removal proposals and suburban drivers that want to keep the freeways.

In early 2021, U.S. Senator Chuck Schumer proposed legislation that would offer cities federal money to remove urban highways. The pilot program includes $10 billion to cover the inspection of existing infrastructure and possibly cover costs involved in removal and redevelopment planning.

Techniques

Freeway-to-boulevard conversion

A freeway-to-boulevard conversion involves demolishing a controlled access highway with an at-grade boulevard. Land formerly devoted to highway lanes and exit ramps are often repurposed into wide sidewalks, bike lanes, green space, or sold for urban development.

One of the earliest examples of a freeway-to-boulevard conversion was the transformation of the West Side Elevated Highway into an urban boulevard in New York City. In 1971, the Urban Development Corporation proposed replacing the aging elevated highway with a new interstate highway in Manhattan. After fierce local opposition, New York City officially gave up on the proposed interstate project in 1985, and allocated 60 percent of its interstate highway funds to mass transit and setting aside $811 million for the "West Side Highway Replacement Project". In 1987, the commission unanimously agreed to build the highway as a six-lane urban boulevard with a parkway-style median and decorative lightposts, along with a  $100 million park on the highway's western periphery.

Another early freeway-to-boulevard conversion involved San Francisco's double-decked Embarcadero Freeway and Central Freeway, which were damaged during the Loma Prieta earthquake in 1989. The Central Freeway was replaced by the multi-modal, landscaped surface-level Octavia Boulevard, and the Embarcadero Freeway was replaced by a boulevard with streetcar and light rail operations in the median, flanked by the restored Beaux-Arts style Ferry Building.

Other early freeway removal projects occurred in Portland, Oregon and Milwaukee, Wisconsin that ultimately reduced traffic, spurred economic development, and allowed for the creation of new neighborhoods and commercial districts. The Harbor Drive Freeway in Portland was replaced by Tom McCall Waterfront Park, while the Park East Freeway in Milwaukee recovered prime land for development in the urban core.  In Toronto, Ontario, the easternmost portion of the Gardiner Expressway, which was located between Don Road and Leslie Street, was demolished in 2000 and replaced with an at-grade urban boulevard with traffic lights, railroad crossings and a bike trail.

Underground relocation
In situations where removing an urban freeway is believed to exacerbate traffic problems within a city, urban planners may resort to relocating the freeway underground and building freeway lids to reclaim the space previously occupied by the surface highway.

In Boston, Massachusetts, the Central Artery (Interstate 93) ran through the center of the city on an elevated green viaduct from its opening in the 1950s until 2005.  The freeway divided historic neighborhoods and business districts in downtown Boston, and it was referred to as Boston's "other Green Monster."  During the 1990s and early 2000s, a $15 billion project known as the Big Dig relocated the Central Artery into tunnels underneath downtown Boston; the old viaduct was demolished, and its path was reclaimed for a surface boulevard and park space.

The Alaskan Way Viaduct in Seattle, Washington, was replaced with the  tunnel that carries the SR-99 freeway underneath the city.

Notable freeway removals

Completed

Proposed

See also 
Highway revolts
Road diet
Cyclability

Urban vitality

References

Further reading

External links 
 Preservenet
 Congress for the New Urbanism
 Six Case Studies in Urban Freeway Removal 
 Removing Urban Freeway

Road transport
Transportation planning
Urban planning